NHL Hockey (titled EA Hockey outside North America) is an ice hockey video game by EA Sports. Released in 1991 for the Sega Mega Drive/Genesis, it is the first game in the NHL series.

Cover

Glenn Healy who was then a goaltender for the New York Islanders.

Reception
Mega placed the game at #2 in their Top Mega Drive Games of All Time. According to Maximum, "A previously under-exposed and almost unheard of sport this side of the great divide, the original NHL on the Megadrive was a benchmark title and thanks to the reputation of John Madden Football and an excellent review in Mean Machines, it became an instant classic."

References

1991 video games
Electronic Arts games
NHL (video game series)
Sega Genesis games
Sega Genesis-only games
Video games set in Canada
Video games set in the United States
EA Sports games
Video games developed in the United States